"Nobody Bothers Gus" is a 1955 science fiction short story by Algis Budrys. It was first published in Astounding Science-Fiction.

There were two sequel stories: "The Peasant Girl" (1956), and "And Then She Found Him" (1957).

Synopsis

Gus Kusevic has astounding mutant powers, but cannot have any effect on the world, because one of his powers is being superhumanly unmemorable.

Reception

"Nobody Bothers Gus" was a finalist for the 1956 Hugo Award for Best Short Story. The Independent, in Budrys' 2008 obituary, noted that the story "remains intensely readable", while The Times called it "exceptional".

References

1955 short stories
Science fiction short stories